The Citadel Bulldogs baseball team represents The Citadel in college baseball. They are classified as NCAA Division I and play in the Southern Conference. The Bulldogs are led by Tony Skole, who began his first season in 2018. They made their one appearance in the College World Series in 1990. They are the first and through 2022 only military school to appear in the College World Series. The Citadel has claimed eight Southern Conference baseball tournament titles and produced seven major league players.

Facilities
The Bulldogs play their games at Joseph P. Riley Jr. Park located just outside The Citadel campus in Charleston, SC. They share the facility with the Class A Charleston RiverDogs, and have permanent rights to play in the stadium as it was built on formerly Citadel-owned land.  The original home of The Citadel baseball team was on WLI Field, on the banks of the Ashley River on campus, and still in use today by The Citadel soccer team. From 1967 until the opening of Riley Park in 1997, The Bulldogs played in College Park, located northeast of campus on Rutledge Avenue. This facility is still in use as The Citadel practice facility and for community purposes. On-campus locker rooms are located in McAlister Field House, an indoor batting cage and other team spaces are located in Vandiver Hall.  Like all Citadel athletic teams, the Bulldogs utilize strength and conditioning, medical, and video spaces in Seignious Hall.

Coaches

Coaching records
Below are records for all coaches who have known records at The Citadel

Comprehensive records are only available beginning with the 1954 season.  The Citadel continues to research and compile records for previous seasons.

Current Staff

Seasons and results

The Citadel has posted four 40 win seasons and twenty-six 30 win seasons.  The Bulldogs are one of the leading programs in the Southern Conference, trailing only Western Carolina in total championships by one, with all other programs several behind the two leaders.

College World Series

NCAA Regionals
The Citadel holds a 16–27 record in the NCAA tournament in 13 appearances, winning the 1990 Atlantic Regional in Coral Gables, Florida.  Their finals matchup against the  resulted in headlines echoing the Hurricanes team name and noting the severe damage in Charleston, South Carolina, from Hurricane Hugo the previous fall, including damage to The Citadel's stadium, College Park.

Southern Conference tournament
The Bulldogs have claimed eight Southern Conference baseball tournament championships, second all-time after Western Carolina.  The Bulldogs won their first tournament in 1990, and most recently won in 2010.  The Tournament's greatest box office success has come when held in Charleston with The Citadel reaching the finals.  The Citadel was a participant in each of the top 10 most attended SoCon Baseball Tournament games through the 2011 Tournament.

Southern Conference Regular Season Championships
The Citadel has won thirteen Southern Conference regular season championships.  They won their first in 1960 and their most recent in 2010.  The Bulldogs have won more Southern Conference regular season championships than any other program currently in the conference.

Rivalries
The Citadel's primary athletic rivals are Virginia Military Institute, Furman and College of Charleston.  The recent rise of College of Charleston's baseball program has led to many close games and strong attendance both at Riley Park and at CofC Baseball Stadium at Patriot's Point.  The Bulldogs have had success against most in state schools, with the exception of Clemson and South Carolina.

Citadel records against opponents through the 2010 season

Primary Rivals

Other SoCon Rivals

† – Chattanooga discontinued baseball after the 1983 season

Other In-State Schools

* – SC State no longer sponsors baseball

Bulldogs in the pros
At least 47 players from The Citadel have played in the Minor Leagues.

Major League Baseball Draft
The Citadel has had 49 Major League Baseball Draft selections since the draft began in 1965. Notable picks include 1985 second round pick (46th overall) Tim Jones, 2001 second round pick (57th overall) Dallas McPherson and 2010 second round pick (41st overall) Asher Wojciechowski.

Major League players
Ten Bulldogs have played in the Major Leagues.

*Years span all seasons played
^Seasons includes partial seasons

Individual honors
The Citadel frequently produces players who claim national and conference level awards.  Below are selected postseason All-America awards as well as Southern Conference awards for full seasons and end of season tournaments.

All-Americans
ABCA
1990 – Anthony Jenkins (OF) – First team
2010 – Asher Wojciechowski (P) – Third team

Baseball America
1983 – Mike Cherry (P) – First team
2010 – Asher Wojciechowski (P) – Third team

Collegiate Baseball/Louisville Slugger
1999 – Rodney Hancock (P) – Third team
1999 – Brian Wiley (P) – Third team
2000 – Philip Hartig (1B) – Second team
2001 – Randy Corn (P) – Second team
2001 – Philip Hartig (1B) – Third team
2002 – Randy Corn (P) – Third team
2004 – Chip Cannon (1B) – Third team
2009 – Richard Jones (C) – Second team
2010 – Asher Wojciechowski (P) – Second team
2013 – Joe Jackson (C) – Third team

Freshman All-American
2013 – Skylar Hunter (P)

Southern Conference Tournament Most Outstanding Player

Southern Conference Player of the Year

Southern Conference Pitcher of the Year

See also
List of NCAA Division I baseball programs

References